Ardessa is a short story by Willa Cather. It was first published in Century in May 1918.

Plot summary
An uppity woman, Ardessa, walks into the offices of "The Outcry", a weekly magazine. Later, she tells off Becky for her shoddy jobs, although it could be said she is bullying her. Miss Kalski gives her tickets for a show and Ardessa only lets her off because Mr Henderson will agree. Ardessa then goes on holiday and gets Miss Milligan to do her job whilst she is away. However, Marcus finds out Becky could be doing a better job and gets her to do it instead. When Ardessa is back, she is told to move to the business department, where she is humbled by Miss Kalski and Mr Henderson.

Characters
The receptionist, an older man.
Miss Ardessa Devine
Marcus O'Mally, the proprietor and editor of "The Outcry", a national weekly. He comes from Goldfield, Nevada and owns a silver-mine in South Dakota.
Mr Gerrard, a journalist.
James, an office boy.
Becky, the copyist.
Miss Rena Kalski, a woman who works in the business department.
Isaac Tietelbaum, Becky's father. He is a tailor. He has eight children.
Mr Henderson
Miss Milligan

Allusions to actual history
Napoleon and Benjamin Disraeli are mentioned.

Allusions to other works
The performing arts are mentioned with Sarah Bernhardt.
Literature is mentioned with William Shakespeare and Francis Bacon.

Literary significance and criticism
The story was written by Cather solely to earn money while she was writing My Ántonia. It was informed by her own journalistic experience at McClure's and her subsequent 'caustic' stance towards muckrakers. It was also influenced by her work for the Home Monthly and the Pittsburgh Leader. 

Critics have added that she might have identified with either Becky or Kalski. The story has been construed as an attack on the American standardization that Cather hated.

References

External links
Full Text at the Willa Cather Archive

1918 short stories
Short stories by Willa Cather
Works originally published in The Century Magazine